La Tebaida  is a municipality in the western part of the department of Quindío, Colombia.  It is located 17 km southwest of the departmental capital Armenia.

History 
La Tebaida was founded by Luis Arango Cardona, born in Manizales on February 19, 1879.  He was one of the first people to undertake systematic archaeological studies of the indigenous tombs (guacas) in Quindío.  His research led to the publication in 1924 of his two-volume book Recuerdos de la guaquería en el Quindío, the first study of its type in Colombia.

In 1899 Arango and his brother had started a farm with an area of 6.7 km² in the south of Armenia. They named their farm La Tebaida, the name of a region in Egypt where Christian monks had sought solitude for contemplation and prayer. In order to increase the productivity of their land, they divided it into 10 hectare blocks. The brothers distributed these to approximately 60 families, who paid the owners with a proportion of their production.

Arango decided to set aside a portion of his farm so that all of the tenants could build their houses in a central location. He laid out a street plan including parks and the principal plaza, located one block from the main farm house. The sections went on sale on August 14, 1916, now considered the foundation date for the town. Within one week, 130 sections had been sold at a price of 20 pesos for each one.  A competition was held to choose the name of the settlement. Although more than 1,000 names were suggested, the most popular choice was the original name of the farm.

In 1917 the settlement was elevated to the status of a corregimiento of Armenia. A census in that year showed there were 478 inhabitants (254 men and 224 women), including 45 married couples and 55 couples living together without being married.

The municipality of La Tebaida was created in 1953 with the separation of 85 km² from Armenia. The first mayor of La Tebaida was Felipe Santiago Mejia. He helped this town get water.

Born in La Tebaida 
 Jesús Arango Cano, diplomat and archaeologist, son of founder Luís Arango Cardona

References

Further reading 
  (2004), Los corredores del tiempo: Guía turística por la historia del Quindío -  - on the history of the municipalities of Quindío until the foundation of the department in 1966

Municipalities of Quindío Department
Populated places established in 1916